Ruba is a town (status since 1970) in the Viciebsk Region of Belarus. It is subordinated to the vykankam (administration) of Čyhunačny District of Viciebsk.

Nearby the museum of the Russian painter Ilya Repin is located, based on Repin's estate Zdravnyovo (Здравнёво, also transliterated as Zdravnevo). 

It is also the birthplace of one of Alexander Lukashenko's most important allies, Filip Anadyrov.

References 

Urban-type settlements in Belarus
Populated places in Vitebsk Region
Vitebsk Governorate